The 2018 Asian Games featured 80 venues for competitions and training on the fourteen days Games competition from 18 August to 2 September 2018.

Jakarta

Gelora Bung Karno Sports Complex 

Source:

East Jakarta
Source:

North Jakarta

Central Jakarta

South Jakarta

Palembang
Source:

West Java and Banten
Source:

References

See also
 2018 Asian Para Games#Venues

 
2018 Asian Games
2018